On February 24, 2023, an air ambulance crashed near the city of Stagecoach, Nevada, United States, killing all five people on board.

Crash
Around 9:15 p.m. PDT, the Lyon County Dispatch Center received multiple calls of a plane crash in Stagecoach, and the plane went off radar 30 minutes later. The plane, a Pilatus PC-12, was recovered several hours later. Federal Aviation Administration (FAA) records show the plane was manufactured in 2002.

Investigation
The Central Lyon Fire Department and Lyon County Sheriff's Department, the National Transportation Safety Board (NTSB), and the FAA are coordinating an investigation into the crash. The NTSB sent a seven-member team of investigators to Stagecoach.

References

Air ambulance services in the United States
Aviation accidents and incidents in Nevada
Aviation accidents and incidents in the United States in 2023